Samuel Prescott  (1751–c. 1777) was a Massachusetts Patriot during the American Revolutionary War.

Samuel or Sam Prescott may also refer to:

Samuel Cate Prescott (1872–1962), American food scientist and microbiologist
Sam Prescott, character in Ambush at Cimarron Pass

See also